The 1999 Cairns Cyclones season was the fourth season that the Cairns Cyclones rugby league team competed in the Queensland Cup. Twelve teams competed in the 22 round competition. Four teams had left at the end of the 1998 season, the Bundaberg Grizzlies, the Gold Coast Vikings, Past Brothers and the Townsville Stingers. The Cairns Cyclones team was managed by Nigel Tillett and coached by Gary Smith.

1999 Queensland Cup

1999 Cairns Cyclones Squad 

Leon Yeatman
Ben Heath
Mick Cooney
Scott Mahon
Greg Burke
Scott Prince
Nathan Fein
Peter Stimson
Paul Dezolt
Scott Asimus
Chad Prien
Liam Johnson
Ben Rauter
Cameron McNab
Nick Patterson
Jason Berg
Shane Muspratt
Scott Donald
Chad Halliday
Adam Connolly
Paul Pensini
John Doyle
Chris Muckett
Denny Lambert
Shannon Van Balen
Peter Deaves
Paul Fowler
Karl Dawson
Scott Mahon
Wade Backmann
Leigh McWilliams
John Manning

1999 Ladder

1999 Queensland Cup Minor Premiers and Premiers

Minor Premiers:  Redcliffe Dolphins
Premiers:  Burleigh Bears

1999 Cairns Cyclones Matches

Rugby league in Queensland